A modillion is an ornate bracket, more horizontal in shape and less imposing than a corbel. They are often seen underneath a cornice which it helps to support. Modillions are more elaborate than dentils (literally translated as small teeth).  All three are selectively used as adjectival historic past participles (corbelled, modillioned, dentillated) as to what co-supports or simply adorns any high structure of a building, such as a terrace of a roof (flat area of a roof), parapet, pediment/entablature, balcony, cornice band or roof cornice. Modillions occur classically under a Corinthian or a Composite cornice, but may support any type of eaves cornice. They may be carved or plain.

See also
 Glossary of architecture

Gallery

References

Architectural elements